Leonid Kozachenko (born 14 May 1955) is a Ukrainian politician, People's Deputy of Ukraine of the 8th convocation, President of the Ukrainian Agrarian Confederation. Former Vice Prime Minister of Ukraine for Agrarian Affairs (June 9, 2001 - November 26, 2002), Academician of the Ukrainian Academy of Technology (since 1997).

Personal life
He is married with two children.

References 

Eighth convocation members of the Verkhovna Rada

1955 births

Living people
Laureates of the Honorary Diploma of the Verkhovna Rada of Ukraine